St. Thomas More High School is a private, Roman Catholic high school in Rapid City, South Dakota.

Notes and references

External links
 School Website

Roman Catholic Diocese of Rapid City
Catholic secondary schools in South Dakota
Education in Rapid City, South Dakota
Educational institutions established in 1991
Schools in Pennington County, South Dakota
Buildings and structures in Rapid City, South Dakota
1991 establishments in South Dakota